= Solstice festival =

Solstice festival may refer to:

- Festivals occurring on the winter solstice
- Festivals occurring on the summer solstice

== See also ==
- Solstice
